Julian (or Jules) Fontana (31 July 181023 December 1869) was a Polish pianist, composer, lawyer, author, translator, and entrepreneur, best remembered as a close friend and musical executor of Polish composer Frédéric Chopin.

Life
Born in Warsaw to a family of Italian origin, Fontana studied law at the University of Warsaw and music under Józef Elsner at the conservatory, where he met Chopin. Fontana left Warsaw in 1831, after the November Uprising and settled in Hamburg, before becoming a pianist and teacher in Paris in 1832.

In 1835 in London he participated in a concert with music played by 6 pianists, the others including Ignaz Moscheles, Johann Baptist Cramer and Charles-Valentin Alkan.

From 1836 to 1838 he lived together with Chopin in his apartment on Chaussée-d'Antin no. 38.

In 1840, Chopin dedicated his 2 Polonaises, Op. 40, to Fontana. These included the "Military Polonaise" in A major.

He took up a wandering life that included:
England and France (1833–1837);
Havana, Cuba (1844–45): On 8 July 1844 he played the music of Chopin for the first time in Cuba. His pupils there included Nicolás Ruiz Espadero.
 New York (1845–51): he gave concerts with Camillo Sivori;
Montgeron, Paris (1852) – becoming part of the literary scene and friends with Adam Mickiewicz.

In New York, on 9 September 1850, Fontana married Camilla Dalcour Tennant (1818–1855), widow of Stephen Cattley Tennant (1800–1848), a merchant, and mother of Enriqueta Augustina Tennant (1843–1908) and four other children. Their son Julian Camillo Adam Fontana was born in Paris on 10 July 1853. Camilla died on 30 March 1855 of pneumonia, while pregnant with her 7th child. Fontana took her children from her first marriage to be looked after by her first husband's family in England. He then returned to New York, where he was naturalised an American citizen on 7 September the same year.

Also in 1855 he published a collection of Chopin's unpublished manuscripts, under the opus numbers 66–73. He also considered publishing more private details concerning Chopin:"I would have as much to say about the man as about the artist [Chopin]. And when his profound diplomacy, allied to his extraordinary wit, concealed from the world what was not a secret to me, who lived with him for almost thirty years in confidence; on raising the veil, I would show him not entirely as general opinion wishes to have him;" (Julian Fontana to Stanisław Egbert Koźmian, 6 June 1851)He then travelled to Cuba in an unsuccessful bid to recover his late wife's estate. He spent some years travelling between Havana, New York, Paris and Poland. In 1859 he published 16 of Chopin's Polish Songs, as Op. 74 (a later edition increased this to 17 songs).

In 1860 Louis Moreau Gottschalk dedicated two compositions to Fontana, La Gitanella and Illusions perdues.

In the 1860s Fontana translated Cervantes' Don Quixote into Polish. In 1869 he published a book of folk astronomy.

He succumbed to deafness and poverty, and committed suicide by inhaling carbon monoxide aged 59 in Paris. He was buried in Montmartre Cemetery. He had arranged, prior to his death, to have his son looked after by his wife's family in England.

Notes

Sources
Dziębowska, E. (2007) "Fontana, Julian, Grove Music Online, access date 19 August 2007 (subscription required)

Farnie, D.A. (2006) "Rylands , Enriqueta Augustina (1843–1908)", Oxford Dictionary of National Biography, Oxford University Press, online edn, Oct 2006 , accessed 20 August 2007 

Hardynski, W. (1948) "Jules Fontana", Polski Slownik Biograficzny, 7.58–9

, French translation, 1953–60; English translation, abridged, 1962

External links

Frédéric Chopin
1810 births
1869 deaths
Polish people of Italian descent
Polish male classical composers
Polish classical pianists
Male classical pianists
Polish Romantic composers
Chopin University of Music alumni
Suicides by carbon monoxide poisoning
Polish expatriates in France
Polish expatriates in the United States
Great Emigration
Polish emigrants to France
Polish expatriates in the United Kingdom
Polish expatriates in Cuba
19th-century classical composers
19th-century classical pianists
19th-century male musicians
1860s suicides
Suicides in France